Gary Clark (born 10 March 1962, Dundee, Scotland) is a Scottish musician, songwriter and record producer. As a performer he is best known as the frontman of 1980s pop band Danny Wilson and mid-1990s rock band King L (as well as for being a member of Transister). Since the mid-1990s he has concentrated on songwriting and production.

Career

Performer – Danny Wilson, solo, King L, Transister
During the early 1980s Clark worked with his longtime friend Ged Grimes in a variety of London-based bands including Clark's Commandos and Dream Kitchen. Returning to Dundee, Clark and Grimes formed a trio with Gary's brother Kit Clark, initially under the name of Spencer Tracy. They signed to Virgin Records in 1986, and (after objections from the estate of Spencer Tracy) changed their name to Danny Wilson.

The following year saw the release of the band's first album, Meet Danny Wilson. The first single, "Mary's Prayer", written by Clark, was a worldwide hit, reaching number 3 in the UK Singles Chart, and number 23 on the United States Billboard Hot 100 chart, earning him a BMI award, and a nomination for an Ivor Novello award for Best Song Musically and Lyrically.  A second album, Bebop Moptop, was released in 1989, including hit single "Second Summer of Love" which reached number 23 in the UK Singles Chart. The band split in 1991.

Following the break-up of Danny Wilson, Clark embarked on a solo career, releasing a 1991 single ("You Can't Turn Around Me") on Seven Records under the temporary project name of Eleven. Reverting to his own name, he released a 1993 solo album called Ten Short Songs About Love on Virgin Records subsidiary Circa Records, with the assistance of the other Danny Wilson members.
 
Clark then formed a rock band called King L (with bass player Eric Pressly, former Bible guitarist Neill MacColl and drummer Matt Laug). The band released an album, A Great Day For Gravity, in 1995.  Clark and Pressly then formed the pop trio Transister with Pressly's girlfriend Keely Hawkes. Transister's songs were featured on the films Nightwatch, Jawbreaker, Wild Things and Charlie's Angels.

Songwriter and producer
Around this time, Clark was increasingly working as a songwriter and record producer. He co-wrote and produced much of Lauren Christy's album Breed, the title track of which was a hit on the Billboard Alternative chart, and left Transister to devote more time to this.

His collaboration with Natalie Imbruglia began when he and Eric Pressly re-mixed the single "Wishing I Was There" from her Left of the Middle album.  He co-wrote and produced eight tracks on her subsequent album, White Lilies Island, and has contributed songs to all of her albums after that – Counting Down The Days, Glorious: The Singles 1997-2007, and Come To Life.

In 2007, Clark moved from London to Los Angeles, where he lived until 2014. Clark co-wrote and co-produced the Ferras record Aliens And Rainbows with The Matrix for Capitol Records, tracks for Clique Girlz and British Band McFly.  He produced and co-wrote the song "Got Dynamite" for Demi Lovato on her number 1 album Here We Go Again.

In 2012, he co-wrote and produced 10 songs on Delta Goodrem's Child of the Universe, including the single "Wish You Were Here", which reached No. 2 on the ARIA charts.

In 2013, Clark co-wrote and produced Alex Hepburn's international hit single "Under". In the same year, Clark co-wrote and co-produced Kim Cesarion's album, Undressed, including the eponymous single, "Undressed".  He co-wrote the song "Back To Life" on Lawson's Chapman Square – Chapter II album, and co-wrote and co-produced "Summer Alive" on The Wanted's Word of Mouth album.

Gin Wigmore's Gravel & Wine album was released in the US, including the Clark co-write "Kill of the Night".  The song has had TV, film and commercial placements, including 666 Park Avenue, Underbelly: Badness, Teen Wolf, Pretty Little Liars and on AMC Halloween week.

Other artists and writers Clark has worked with include Lloyd Cole, Liz Phair, Skin (Skunk Anansie), Melanie C, Emma Bunton, Cathy Dennis, Ashley Parker Angel, Nick Carter, Skye Edwards (Morcheeba), Lauren Christy, Julia Fordham, Shannon Noll, Mark Owen, Eddi Reader, The Veronicas, David McAlmont, Delta Goodrem, Lawson, The Wanted, Gin Wigmore and Reece Mastin.

In 2014, Clark returned to live in his home town of Dundee. Since then he has co-written The Veronicas' song "Cold", co-composed and co-performed the music on the 2016 film Sing Street, co-written songs on the forthcoming album by Irish band Little Hours, and co-written and co-produced the soon-to-be-released album by The Xcerts.  He is currently working on the stage musical "Nanny McPhee" with Emma Thompson, and on "Modern Love" (an eight-part series for Amazon with John Carney).

References

External links
 Gary Clark on Myspace

1962 births
Living people
Musicians from Dundee
Scottish pop singers
20th-century Scottish male singers
Scottish singer-songwriters
Scottish record producers
British male singer-songwriters